KSD may refer to:

Radio and television stations
 KSD (FM), a radio station in St. Louis, Missouri, U.S.
 KSD, former callsign for KTRS (AM), a radio station in St. Louis, Missouri, U.S.
 KSD-TV, former callsign for KSDK, a television station in St. Louis, Missouri, U.S.

Education

India
 KSD Shanbhag Vidyalaya, a school in Satara, Maharashtra

United States
 Kansas State School for the Deaf, Olathe
 Keeneyville School District 20, Hanover Park, Illinois
 Kentucky School for the Deaf, Danville

Other uses
 Tolai language (ISO 639:ksd), Papua New Guinea
 Karlstad Airport (IATA airport code),  Sweden
 Koninklijke Stichting Defensiemusea (Royal Foundation for Defence Museums), the Netherlands
 Korea Securities Depository
 KSD-64, an NSA-developed memory chip
 KSD-1, a WWII US air-to-surface missile
 Kadanuumuu (KSD-VP-1/1), an Australopithecus afarensis fossil discovered in Afar